Mukachevo (Moqas) is a rural locality (a village) in Isimovsky Selsoviet, Kugarchinsky District, Bashkortostan, Russia. The population was 149 as of 2010. There is 1 street.

Geography 
Mukachevo is located 34 km south of Mrakovo (the district's administrative centre) by road. Gavrilovsky is the nearest rural locality.

References 

Rural localities in Kugarchinsky District